László Miskolczi (born 12 March 1986, in Nyíregyháza) is a Hungarian football player who currently plays for Várda SE.

References
Profile at HLSZ.
Profile at MLSZ.

1986 births
Living people
People from Nyíregyháza
Hungarian footballers
Association football midfielders
Nyíregyháza Spartacus FC players
Paksi FC players
Kisvárda FC players
Nemzeti Bajnokság I players
Sportspeople from Szabolcs-Szatmár-Bereg County